Aantaliya is a census town in Navsari district of the Indian state, Gujarat.

Demographics
 India census, Aantaliya had a population of 4989. Males constitute 54% of the population and females 46%. Aantaliya has an average literacy rate of 76%, higher than the national average of 59.5%; with 59% of the males and 41% of females literate. 10% of the population is under 6 years of age.

References

Cities and towns in Navsari district